The Missouri Department of Revenue is a U.S. state government agency in Missouri created under the Missouri Constitution in 1945, which is responsible for ensuring the proper functioning of state and local government through the collection and distribution of state revenue, and administration of state laws governing driver licensing, and motor vehicle sale and registration. Mount Etna Morris served as the department's first director from July 1946 until his election as State Treasurer of Missouri in November 1948, and later served again as director from 1953 to 1956. The current director, Kenneth Zellers, was named by Governor Mike Parson on October 2, 2019.

Organization

Director of Revenue
Office of the Director
Deputy Director
Legislative Liaison
Director of Communications
Administration Division is responsible for providing human resources, payroll, procurement, and related services for the Department
Financial & General Services Bureau
Personnel Services Bureau
Legal Services Division provides legal services for the Director and all Divisions of the Department, and investigates criminal violations of state revenue/motor vehicle laws
General Counsel's Office
Criminal Tax Investigation Bureau
Compliance and Investigation Bureau
Motor Vehicle and Driver Licensing Division issues, suspends and revokes drivers licenses, and titles motor vehicles
Driver Licensing Bureau
License Offices Bureau
Motor Vehicle Bureau
Taxation Division is responsible for administering the state's tax laws. Its processes more than 5 million tax returns annually, responds to taxpayer inquiries, and audits taxpayers for compliance with state tax laws
Business Tax Bureau
Personal Tax Bureau
Collections and Taxpayer Assistance Bureau
Field Compliance Bureau
State Lottery Commission supervises the Missouri State Lottery
State Tax Commission is responsible for ensuring equal property tax assessments and providing a neutral forum for resolving property tax disputes

See also
 Taxation in Missouri

External links
 Missouri Department of Revenue Website
 Missouri Official Manual: Department of Revenue
Publications by or about the Missouri Department of Revenue at Internet Archive.

References

Revenue, Department of
Motor vehicle registration agencies
US state tax agencies
1945 establishments in Missouri
Government agencies established in 1945